Gerard Granollers and Jordi Samper-Montaña were the defending champions, but decided not to compete.

Seeds

Draw

External links
 Main Draw

Franken Challenge - Doubles
2015 Doubles